The Forum, the BBC World Service's flagship discussion programme, brings together prominent thinkers from different disciplines and different parts of the world with the aim of creating stimulating discussion informed by highly distinct academic, artistic, and cultural perspectives. The World Service broadcasts the programme on Saturdays at 2106 GMT and repeats it on Sundays at 0906 GMT and on Mondays at 0206 GMT.  BBC Radio 4 also broadcasts an edited 30-minute version of the programme.

Format
Each episode of The Forum brings together three thinkers, leading figures from different academic and artistic disciplines. A typical line-up might include a scientist, a writer or other artist, and a philosopher or cultural thinker.

Each guest is questioned by the presenter about their latest big idea, a topic area that is of particular interest to them and in which they are a particular expert. During the course of each section the other guests are invited to contribute with criticisms, insights and support of their own.

Sixty Second Idea
Each week one of the guests is invited to present an idea in sixty seconds that they believe will make the world a better place. These ideas are not always practicable, but they are frequently entertaining and insightful. The 60 Second Idea and the discussion it produces is released as a podcast.

History
The first episode of the show was broadcast on the BBC World Service on 6 April 2008. It has been broadcast every week since then.

The Forum was founded by Emily Kasriel, who was the program's Executive Producer for the show's first four years and occasionally presented it, as well as painting illustrations for The Forum's website.

Presenters
The programme's presenter, who has been part of the show since its inception, is former BBC diplomatic correspondent Bridget Kendall.

Guest presenters
Zeinab Badawi
Martin Rees
Rana Mitter
Tim Marlow
Angie Hobbs
Marcus du Sautoy
Ritula Shah

Distribution
The Forum is broadcast through the BBC World Service and its international broadcasting partners. The show is also available online, to download and as a podcast. All previous shows are archived online.

Previous guests
Previous guests include:
Nobel Prize–winning biologist John Sulston
Political scientist Joseph Nye
Former Afghan finance minister Ashraf Ghani
British astrophysicist Lord Martin Rees
Nigerian novelist Chimamanda Ngozi Adichie
Canadian writer Naomi Klein
Egyptian writer Alaa Al Aswany
Ghanaian philosopher Kwame Anthony Appiah
Argentinian architect Cesar Pelli
US psychologist Steven Pinker
South African judge Albie Sachs
Polish Canadian writer Eva Hoffman
British philosopher John Gray
Mathematician Marcus du Sautoy

Notes and references

External links

The Forum Facebook page

BBC World Service programmes
British podcasts
Science podcasts